Mary L. Lightfoot (1889–1970) was an American painter and printmaker.

Lightfoot was born in Ravenna, Texas.

She summered in Europe and in Taos, New Mexico during her career. Late in life she moved to Paris, Texas, remaining there for fifteen years until her death. She was buried in Paris; her death certificate gives her year of birth as 1888.

Education 
Lightfoot received a baccalaureate from the College of Industrial Arts in Denton. After studies at the North Texas State Teachers College, she received a master of arts degree from Columbia University. Lightfoot taught in the public school system of Dallas until her retirement. She summered in Europe and in Taos, New Mexico during her career. Late in life she moved to Paris, Texas, remaining there for fifteen years until her death. She was buried in Paris; her death certificate gives her year of birth as 1888.

Career/Organization 
She was an art teacher at the Dallas Independent School District.

In 1940 she was one of eight women who founded the Printmakers Guild, later called Texas Printmakers, to challenge the male-dominated Lone Star Printmakers; the others were Lucile Land Lacy, Stella LaMond, Bertha Landers, Verda Ligon, Blanche McVeigh, Coreen May Spellman, and Lura Ann Taylor. She exhibited widely in Texas during her career.

Their group was created as a result from being denied membership in the male established Lone Star Printmakers. There was total of fifty members and participants and not until 1961 did two men join. Most members were either public school teachers or university professors.

Honors/Rewards 
She was awarded the Junior League Purchase Prize, "Fourth Annual Texas Print Exhibition", Dallas Museum of Art, 1965.

Affiliations 
She was the President of the Dallas Print Society in 1943.

References

1889 births
1970 deaths
American women painters
American women printmakers
20th-century American painters
20th-century American printmakers
20th-century American women artists
Texas Woman's University alumni
University of North Texas alumni
Columbia University alumni
People from Fannin County, Texas